Matthew Patrick Maloney (born December 6, 1971) is an American former professional basketball player who played seven seasons in the National Basketball Association (NBA).

Early years
Maloney was born in Silver Spring, Maryland, but grew up in Haddonfield, New Jersey.

College career
Maloney began his basketball career at Vanderbilt University, transferring after his freshman year to the University of Pennsylvania, and played three seasons as a Penn Quaker.

During Maloney's three seasons as a Penn Quaker, the team went 42–0 in the Ivy League with him as a starting guard, including three Ivy League championships and subsequently three bids to the NCAA tournament. The Penn Quakers went 69–14 during Maloney's career. He was also a three-time first-team All-Ivy selection, and was the Ivy League's Player of the Year his senior season.

Maloney holds several Quaker records, including a 37-point game (sophomore year vs. American; tied for fourth-best single game scoring performance in program history), 91 three-pointers made in single season (second all-time, 1992–93), 44.4% three-pointer field goal percentage (fifth all-time, 1992–93), 89.7% free throw percentage (61 of 68, first all-time, 1993–94), and 62 steals in a single season (fourth all time, 1993–94).

In the Philadelphia Big 5, Maloney was a two-time first-team All-Big 5 selection (1992–93 and 1994–95). Maloney was second-team All-Big 5 selection in 1993–94.

Professional career
Never drafted by a National Basketball Association team, he spent time in the CBA before finding playing time with three clubs in the former competition over the course of six seasons.

Maloney played with the Houston Rockets from 1996 to 1999, the Chicago Bulls during 1999–2000 and the Atlanta Hawks for the 2000–01 and 2002–03 seasons.

He is notable for his rookie season when the two players in front of him on the depth chart had season ending injuries and Maloney was able to start all 82 regular season games at point guard for a Rockets squad with future Hall of Famers Charles Barkley, Clyde Drexler, and Hakeem Olajuwon. The club won 57 games, eventually losing to the Utah Jazz in six games in the Western Conference Finals during the 1997 playoffs.

Maloney's father, Jim, a longtime assistant coach for John Chaney at Temple University, died only months before Maloney began playing for his first NBA team. During his career he appeared in 21 playoff games and scored a total of 177 points, achieving a career-high 26 points twice during the 1997 playoffs.

References

External links

1971 births
Living people
American men's basketball players
Atlanta Hawks players
Basketball players from Maryland
Basketball players from New Jersey
Chicago Bulls players
Grand Rapids Mackers players
Haddonfield Memorial High School alumni
Houston Rockets players
Penn Quakers men's basketball players
People from Haddonfield, New Jersey
People from Silver Spring, Maryland
Point guards
Sportspeople from Camden County, New Jersey
Sportspeople from Montgomery County, Maryland
Undrafted National Basketball Association players
Vanderbilt Commodores men's basketball players